Diehard Duterte Supporters (DDS) is a name adopted by political extremists who support the 16th president of the Philippines, Rodrigo Duterte, whom they defend as a necessary strongman, to refer to themselves. The term was popularized during the 2016 presidential elections and has since been used to refer to the most unquestioning (i.e., the diehards) among Duterte's loyalists, who wear it as a badge of honor and pride. The term commonly refers to a group of people (including netizens) engaging in internet trolling and disruptive behaviour online to defend Duterte.

Its initialism, DDS, was taken directly from the Davao Death Squad—a vigilante group that had existed in Davao City during Duterte's term as mayor.

Ideology

As their self-appellation suggests, the DDS are identified by their unwavering loyalty to Duterte and [Marcos] rather than alignment to any particular political-economic ideology. The DDS mirror Duterte's policy stances and shifts, even when such shifts contradict his self-identification as a socialist and membership in a democratic socialist party, PDP–Laban. Accordingly, observers have described the DDS as a right-wing populist or even far-right phenomenon the existence of which preserves the status quo. Such an assertion has been demonstrated by the expansion in recent years of the historical and religiously informed cultural hostility toward left-wing politics in the country as the Philippines has been described as the most right-wing country in the world, which had been previously reserved for the Communist Party of the Philippines (CPP) but which had during Duterte's presidency begun to include national-democratic, social-liberal and even centrist organizations such as the Makabayan, Akbayan and Liberal parties, respectively.

In common with Duterte's original support base outside Manila, the DDS had been enthusiastic about the subsequently derailed transition to a federal form of government through constitutional reform. Some within the DDS, disillusioned by both the social doctrines of the Catholic Church and the sanctimoniousness of the professional–managerial class (PMC), may have also stood behind left-leaning causes such as the redefinition of civil marriage, which Duterte had also supported but has since backtracked on. The DDS have also mirrored calls made by some core supporters for the installation of a revolutionary government with Duterte as leader. Such calls, however, have been motivated less by a willingness to pursue systemic transformation than by a desire for greater participation in the status quo.

Behavior

The DDS are distinguished by their uninhibited use of rabid and vitriolic speech, which mirrors Duterte's own. They respond to the slightest criticism of Duterte with accusations of bias, shilling, wokescolding, CPP membership or sympathizing with the New People's Army (NPA), notwithstanding Duterte's own tactical dealings with the National Democratic Front of the Philippines (NDFP) during his mayorship of Davao. The DDS usually engage in online bullying and harassment against all activists, as well as the Otso Diretso electoral alliance, Vice President Leni Robredo, and even fellow Dutertists suspected of disloyalty, often by issuing threats or tagging them implicitly for punishment. Dilawan and pulahan are two of the slurs most frequently employed to shut down or gaslight those marked for harassment. The DDS, despite Duterte's claims to being a socialist, have also participated in amplified smear campaigns directed against organizers of and contributors to COVID-19 mutual-aid efforts. It is for these reasons that the DDS are collectively considered even by otherwise sympathetic analysts as a successful hate group.

Long before the DDS' ascent to national prominence, however, certain PMC actors themselves had allegedly orchestrated smear campaigns, known locally as "black propaganda", through SMS and other means against disfavored politicians and unapproved-of election candidates. Such derision has been described as a desire on the part of members of the PMC to "want to humiliate their adversaries by attributing to them a desperate lack of intelligence, empathy, and virtue".

Organizational representation

Several organizations and social-media communities bear the DDS initialism as a way of signifying unapologetic allegiance to Duterte. Some of these are the Duterte Youth, Pederalismo ng Dugong Dakilang Sanduguan (PDDS) and Partido Federal ng Pilipinas (PFP). These organizations claim to represent sectors of Philippine society marginalized by those who had taken power through the first EDSA Revolution and betrayed by those behind the second.

Global context
The DDS is part of an ascendant global far right; indeed, members find affinity with right-wing populist movements across the globe and their respective leaders. In the academic and popular discourse, parallels had been drawn between the DDS and other strongman populist movements such as Erdoğanism in Turkey, Bolsonarism in Brazil and Trumpism in the United States, among many others, notwithstanding the uniqueness of the conditions that give rise to and, in turn, motivate each of them. For instance, it has been demonstrated that popular support for Duterte has been driven to a significant extent by expatriate workers resentful of having to support themselves and their families from abroad, a motivating factor only partially shared by workers in core countries.

See also
 Cult 
 Ferdinand Marcos' cult of personality
 Mocha Uson Blog
 Pinoy pride
 Trumpism - American equivalent
 People's Party of Canada - Canadian equivalent 
 Putinism - Russian equivalent
 Brexit - British equivalent 
 Modi bhakt - Indian equivalent
 Bolsonarismo-Brazilian equivalent

Notes

References

Cults of personality
Fandom
Internet trolls
Exceptionalism
Hate speech
Filipino anti-communists
Far-right politics in Asia
Right-wing populism in Asia
Diaspora studies
Presidency of Rodrigo Duterte
Cults